The 1938 Toronto Argonauts season was the 52nd season for the team since the franchise's inception in 1873. The team finished in second place in the Interprovincial Rugby Football Union with a 5–1 record and qualified for the playoffs for the third consecutive season. The Argonauts defeated the Ottawa Rough Riders in a two-game total-points IRFU Final series before winning the Eastern Final over the Sarnia Imperials. The defending champion Argonauts defeated the Winnipeg Blue Bombers in the 26th Grey Cup game by a score of 30–7, winning the franchise's fifth Grey Cup championship. It was also the first time that the Argonauts had repeated as champions as this was a rematch of the previous year's Grey Cup game.

Preseason

Regular season

Standings

Schedule

Postseason

Grey Cup

December 10 @ Varsity Stadium (Attendance: 18,778)

References

Toronto Argonauts seasons
Grey Cup championship seasons
Toronto Argo